The 2017 Boyd Tinsley Women's Clay Court Classic was a professional tennis tournament played on outdoor clay courts. It was the sixteenth edition of the tournament and part of the 2017 ITF Women's Circuit, offering a total of $60,000 in prize money. It took place in Charlottesville, United States, from 24–30 April 2017.

Singles main draw entrants

Seeds 

 1 Rankings as of 17 April 2017

Other entrants 
The following players received wildcards into the singles main draw:
  Claire Liu
  Maria Sanchez
  Ajla Tomljanović

The following player received entry into the singles main draw by a protected ranking:
  Anhelina Kalinina

The following players received entry from the qualifying draw:
  Robin Anderson
  Elyne Boeykens
  Elizaveta Ianchuk
  Carol Zhao

The following player received entry as a Lucky Loser:
  Julia Elbaba

Champions

Singles

 Madison Brengle def.  Caroline Dolehide, 6–4, 6–3

Doubles

 Jovana Jakšić /  Catalina Pella def.  Madison Brengle /  Danielle Collins, 6–4, 7–6(7–5)

External links 
 2017 Boyd Tinsley Women's Clay Court Classic at ITFtennis.com
 Official website

2017 in American tennis
2017 ITF Women's Circuit
2017
2017